Efraín Orona Zavala (born 22 February 1999) is a Mexican professional footballer who plays as a defensive midfielder for Liga MX club Mazatlán, on loan from Pachuca.

International career
In April 2019, Orona was included in the 21-player squad to represent Mexico at the U-20 World Cup in Poland.

Career statistics

Club

References

External links
 
 
 

1999 births
Living people
Association football defenders
Footballers from Chihuahua
C.F. Pachuca players
Mexico under-20 international footballers
Mexican footballers